Space tourism is human space travel for recreational purposes. There are several different types of space tourism, including orbital, suborbital and lunar space tourism.

During the period from 2001 to 2009, seven space tourists made eight space flights aboard a Russian Soyuz spacecraft to the International Space Station, brokered by Space Adventures in conjunction with Roscosmos and RSC Energia. The publicized price was in the range of US$20–25 million per trip. Some space tourists have signed contracts with third parties to conduct certain research activities while in orbit. By 2007, space tourism was thought to be one of the earliest markets that would emerge for commercial spaceflight.

Russia halted orbital space tourism in 2010 due to the increase in the International Space Station crew size, using the seats for expedition crews that would previously have been sold to paying spaceflight participants. Orbital tourist flights were set to resume in 2015 but the planned flight was postponed indefinitely. Russian orbital tourism eventually resumed with the launch of Soyuz MS-20 in 2021.

On June 7, 2019, NASA announced that starting in 2020, the organization aims to start allowing private astronauts to go on the International Space Station, with the use of the SpaceX Crew Dragon spacecraft and the Boeing Starliner spacecraft for public astronauts, which is planned to be priced at 35,000 USD per day for one astronaut, and an estimated 50 million USD for the ride there and back.

Work also continues towards developing suborbital space tourism vehicles. This is being done by aerospace companies like Blue Origin and Virgin Galactic. SpaceX announced in 2018 that they are planning on sending space tourists, including Yusaku Maezawa, on a free-return trajectory around the Moon on the Starship.

Precursors

The Soviet space program was successful in broadening the pool of cosmonauts. The Soviet Intercosmos program included cosmonauts selected from Warsaw Pact member countries (Czechoslovakia, Poland, East Germany, Bulgaria, Hungary, Romania) and later from allies of the USSR (Cuba, Mongolia, Vietnam) and non-aligned countries (India, Syria, Afghanistan). Most of these cosmonauts received full training for their missions and were treated as equals, but were generally given shorter flights than Soviet cosmonauts. The European Space Agency (ESA) also took advantage of the program.

The US Space Shuttle program included payload specialist positions which were usually filled by representatives of companies or institutions managing a specific payload on that mission. These payload specialists did not receive the same training as professional NASA astronauts and were not employed by NASA. In 1983, Ulf Merbold from the ESA and Byron Lichtenberg from MIT (engineer and Air Force fighter pilot) were the first payload specialists to fly on the Space Shuttle, on mission STS-9.

In 1984, Charles D. Walker became the first non-government astronaut to fly, with his employer McDonnell Douglas paying US$40,000 for his flight. During the 1970s, Shuttle prime contractor Rockwell International studied a $200–300 million removable cabin that could fit into the Shuttle's cargo bay. The cabin could carry up to 74 passengers into orbit for up to three days. Space Habitation Design Associates proposed, in 1983, a cabin for 72 passengers in the bay. Passengers were located in six sections, each with windows and its own loading ramp, and with seats in different configurations for launch and landing. Another proposal was based on the Spacelab habitation modules, which provided 32 seats in the payload bay in addition to those in the cockpit area. A 1985 presentation to the National Space Society stated that, although flying tourists in the cabin would cost $1 million to $1.5 million per passenger without government subsidy, within 15 years, 30,000 people a year would pay US$25,000 each to fly in space on new spacecraft. The presentation also forecast flights to lunar orbit within 30 years and visits to the lunar surface within 50 years.

As the shuttle program expanded in the early 1980s, NASA began a Space Flight Participant program to allow citizens without scientific or governmental roles to fly. Christa McAuliffe was chosen as the first Teacher in Space in July 1985 from 11,400 applicants. 1,700 applied for the Journalist in Space program. An Artist in Space program was considered, and NASA expected that after McAuliffe's flight two to three civilians a year would fly on the shuttle. After McAuliffe was killed in the Challenger disaster in January 1986, the programs were canceled. McAuliffe's backup, Barbara Morgan, eventually got hired in 1998 as a professional astronaut and flew on STS-118 as a mission specialist. A second journalist-in-space program, in which NASA green-lighted Miles O'Brien to fly on the Space Shuttle, was scheduled to be announced in 2003. That program was canceled in the wake of the Columbia disaster on STS-107 and subsequent emphasis on finishing the International Space Station before retiring the Space Shuttle.

Initially, senior figures at NASA strongly opposed space tourism on principle; from the beginning of the ISS expeditions, NASA stated it was not interested in accommodating paying guests. The Subcommittee on Space and Aeronautics Committee on Science of the House of Representatives held in June 2001 revealed the shifting attitude of NASA towards paying space tourists wanting to travel to the ISS in its statement on the hearing's purpose: "Review the issues and opportunities for flying nonprofessional astronauts in space, the appropriate government role for supporting the nascent space tourism industry, use of the Shuttle and Space Station for Tourism, safety and training criteria for space tourists, and the potential commercial market for space tourism." The subcommittee report was interested in evaluating Dennis Tito's extensive training and his experience in space as a nonprofessional astronaut.

With the realities of the post-Perestroika economy in Russia, its space industry was especially starved for cash. The Tokyo Broadcasting System (TBS) offered to pay for one of its reporters to fly on a mission. Toyohiro Akiyama was flown in 1990 to Mir with the eighth crew and returned a week later with the seventh crew. Cost estimates vary from $10 million up to $37 million. Akiyama gave a daily TV broadcast from orbit and also performed scientific experiments for Russian and Japanese companies.

In 1991, British chemist Helen Sharman was selected from a pool of 13,000 applicants to be the first Briton in space. The program was known as Project Juno and was a cooperative arrangement between the Soviet Union and a group of British companies. The Project Juno consortium failed to raise the funds required, and the program was almost canceled. Reportedly Mikhail Gorbachev ordered it to proceed under Soviet expense in the interests of international relations, but in the absence of Western underwriting, less expensive experiments were substituted for those in the original plans. Sharman flew aboard Soyuz TM-12 to Mir and returned aboard Soyuz TM-11.

Sub-orbital space tourism

Successful projects 
 Scaled Composites won the $10 million X Prize in October 2004 with SpaceShipOne, as the first private company to reach and surpass an altitude of  twice within two weeks. The altitude is beyond the Kármán Line, the arbitrarily-defined boundary of space. There were no space tourists on the flights even though the vehicle has seats for three passengers. Instead there was additional weight to make up for the weight of passengers.
 In 2005, Virgin Galactic was founded as a joint venture between Scaled Composites and Richard Branson's Virgin Group. Eventually Virgin Group owned the entire project. Virgin Galactic began building SpaceShipTwo-class spaceplanes. The first of these spaceplanes, VSS Enterprise, was intended to commence its first commercial flights in 2015, and tickets were on sale at a price of $200,000 (later raised to $250,000). However, the company suffered a considerable setback when the Enterprise broke up over the Mojave Desert during a test flight in October 2014. Over 700 tickets had been sold prior to the accident. A second spaceplane, VSS Unity, completed a successful test flight with four passengers on July 11, 2021 to an altitude of nearly 90 km (56 mi).
 Blue Origin developed the New Shepard reusable suborbital launch system specifically to enable short-duration space tourism. Blue Origin plans to ferry a maximum of six persons on a brief journey to space on board the New Shepard. The capsule is attached to the top portion of an 18-meter (59-foot) rocket.

Canceled projects 
 Armadillo Aerospace was developing a two-seat vertical takeoff and landing (VTOL) rocket called Hyperion, which will be marketed by Space Adventures. Hyperion uses a capsule similar in shape to the Gemini capsule. The vehicle will use a parachute for descent but will probably use retrorockets for final touchdown, according to remarks made by Armadillo Aerospace at the Next Generation Suborbital Researchers Conference in February 2012. The assets of Armadillo Aerospace were sold to Exos Aerospace and while SARGE is continuing to be developed, it is unclear whether Hyperion is still being developed.
 XCOR Aerospace was developing a suborbital vehicle called Lynx until development was halted in May 2016. The Lynx would take off from a runway under rocket power. Unlike SpaceShipOne and SpaceShipTwo, Lynx would not require a mothership. Lynx was designed for rapid turnaround, which would enable it to fly up to four times per day. Because of this rapid flight rate, Lynx had fewer seats than SpaceShipTwo, carrying only one pilot and one spaceflight participant on each flight. XCOR expected to roll out the first Lynx prototype and begin flight tests in 2015, but as of late 2017, XCOR was unable to complete their prototype development and filed for bankruptcy.
 Citizens in Space, formerly the Teacher in Space Project, is a project of the United States Rocket Academy. Citizens in Space combines citizen science with citizen space exploration. The goal is to fly citizen-science experiments and citizen explorers (who travel free) who will act as payload operators on suborbital space missions. By 2012, Citizens in Space had acquired a contract for 10 suborbital flights with XCOR Aerospace and expected to acquire additional flights from XCOR and other suborbital spaceflight providers in the future. In 2012, Citizens in Space reported they had begun training three citizen astronaut candidates and would select seven additional candidates over the next 12 to 14 months.
 Space Expedition Corporation was preparing to use the Lynx for "Space Expedition Curaçao", a commercial flight from Hato Airport on Curaçao, and planned to start commercial flights in 2014. The costs were $95,000 each.
 Axe Apollo Space Academy promotion by Unilever which planned to provide 23 people suborbital spaceflights on board the Lynx.
 EADS Astrium, a subsidiary of European aerospace giant EADS, announced its space tourism project in June 2007.

Orbital space tourism 

As of 2021, Space Adventures and SpaceX are the only companies to have coordinated tourism flights to Earth's orbit. Virginia-based Space Adventures has worked with Russia to use its Soyuz spacecraft to fly ultra-wealthy individuals to the International Space Station. The tourists included entrepreneur and space investor Anousheh Ansari and Cirque du Soleil co-founder Guy Laliberté. Those missions were priced at around $20 million each. The space industry could soon be headed for a tourism revolution if SpaceX and Boeing make good on their plans to take tourists to orbit.

Successful projects 

At the end of the 1990s, MirCorp, a private venture that was by then in charge of the space station, began seeking potential space tourists to visit Mir in order to offset some of its maintenance costs. Dennis Tito, an American businessman and former JPL scientist, became their first candidate. When the decision was made to de-orbit Mir, Tito managed to switch his trip to the International Space Station (ISS) aboard a Russian Soyuz spacecraft through a deal between MirCorp and US-based Space Adventures, Ltd. Dennis Tito visited the ISS for seven days in April–May 2001, becoming the world's first "fee-paying" space tourist. Tito paid a reported $20 million for his trip.

Tito was followed in April 2002 by South African Mark Shuttleworth (Soyuz TM-34). The third was Gregory Olsen in October 2005 (Soyuz TMA-7). In February 2003, the Space Shuttle Columbia disintegrated on re-entry into the Earth's atmosphere, killing all seven astronauts aboard. After this disaster, space tourism on the Russian Soyuz program was temporarily put on hold, because Soyuz vehicles became the only available transport to the ISS. After the Shuttle's return to service in July 2005, space tourism was resumed. In September 2006, an Iranian American businesswoman named Anousheh Ansari became the fourth space tourist (Soyuz TMA-9).) In April 2007, Charles Simonyi, an American businessman of Hungarian descent, joined their ranks (Soyuz TMA-10). Simonyi became the first repeat space tourist, paying again to fly on Soyuz TMA-14 in March 2009. British-American Richard Garriott became the next space tourist in October 2008 aboard Soyuz TMA-13. Canadian Guy Laliberté visited the ISS in September 2009 aboard Soyuz TMA-16, becoming the last visiting tourist until December 2021. Originally the third member aboard Soyuz TMA-18M should have been the British singer Sarah Brightman as a space tourist, but on May 13, 2015, she announced she had withdrawn from training.

Since the Space Shuttle was retired in 2011, Soyuz once again became the only means of accessing the ISS, and so tourism was once again put on hold. On June 7, 2019, NASA announced a plan to open the ISS to space tourism again.

On September 16, 2021, the Inspiration4 mission launched from the Kennedy Space Center on a SpaceX Falcon 9 and spent almost three days in orbit aboard the Crew Dragon Resilience, becoming the first all-civilian crew to fly an orbital space mission.

On April 8, 2022, SpaceX launched Axiom Mission 1 (Ax-1) for Axiom Space, sending three space tourists and retired NASA astronaut Michael López-Alegría to the International Space Station on a Crew Dragon spacecraft. Ax-1 was the first mission to send multiple space tourists to the ISS. The mission also marked the first of NASA's officially-sanctioned Private Astronaut Missions (PAMs) to the ISS. Through these missions, NASA hopes to create a non-NASA market for human spaceflight to enable cost-sharing on future commercial space stations.

Ongoing projects 
 The Boeing Starliner capsule is being developed as part of the NASA's Commercial Crew Program. Part of the agreement with NASA allows Boeing to sell seats for space tourists. Boeing proposed including one seat per flight for a spaceflight participant at a price that would be competitive with what Roscosmos charges tourists.
 Future Axiom missions: Axiom Space and SpaceX plan to launch the second Axiom mission Ax-2 in 2023 Q1. Missions up to Ax-4 have been contracted with SpaceX.
 The Polaris Program: The commander and financier of the Inspiration4 mission, Jared Isaacman, announced plans for a three-mission program called Polaris in February 2022. The first mission, Polaris Dawn, will launch four private astronauts in a Crew Dragon spacecraft to earth orbit. Polaris Dawn will be a free-flyer mission in which the spacecraft will not perform any rendezvous maneuvers, instead aiming to surpass the all-time earth orbit altitude record of 1,373 kilometres set by Gemini XI. Polaris Dawn also seeks to include the first private Extravehicular activity (EVA). The last Polaris program mission is planned to be the first crewed flight of the in-development Starship launch system.

Canceled projects 
 In 2004, Bigelow Aerospace established a competition called America's Space Prize, which offered a $50 million prize to the first US company to create a reusable spacecraft capable of carrying passengers to a Nautilus space station. The prize expired in January 2010 without anyone making a serious effort to win it.
 The Space Island Group proposed having 20,000 people on their "space island" by 2020.
 A United States startup firm, Orion Span announced during the early part of 2018 that it planned to launch and position a luxury space hotel in orbit within several years. Aurora Space Station, the name of the hotel, would have offered guests (at most six individuals) 12 days of staying in a pill-shaped space hotel for $9.5 million. The hotel's cabins would have measured approximately 12.9 metres (43 feet) by 4.8 metres (14 feet) in width. 
 Space Adventures Crew Dragon mission: Space Adventures and SpaceX planned to send up to four tourists to low Earth orbit for a few days in late 2021 or early 2022. In October 2021, Space Adventures stated that the mission contract had expired, though the possibility of a future partnership with SpaceX was left open.
 Galactic Suite Design
 Orbital Technologies Commercial Space Station
 Space Industries Incorporated
 Space Islands

Tourism beyond Earth orbit

Ongoing projects 
 In February 2017, Elon Musk announced that substantial deposits from two individuals had been received by SpaceX for a Moon loop flight using a free return trajectory and that this could happen as soon as late 2018. Musk said that the cost of the mission would be "comparable" to that of sending an astronaut to the International Space Station, about US$70 million in 2017. In February 2018, Musk announced that the Falcon Heavy rocket would not be used for crewed missions. The proposal changed in 2018 to use the Starship launch system instead. In September 2018, Musk revealed the passenger for the trip, Yusaku Maezawa during a livestream. Yusaku Maezawa described the plan for his trip in further detail, dubbed the #dearMoon project, intending to take 6–8 artists with him on the journey to inspire the artists to create new art. A second mission with a similar flight profile is planned to follow, with Dennis Tito and his wife Akiko Tito as two of the passengers.
 Space Adventures Ltd. have announced that they are working on DSE-Alpha, a circumlunar mission to the Moon, with the price per passenger being $100,000,000.

Cancelled projects 
 Excalibur Almaz proposed to take three tourists in a flyby around the Moon, using modified Almaz space station modules, in a low-energy trajectory flyby around the Moon. The trip would last around 6 months. However, their equipment was never launched and is to be converted into an educational exhibit.
 The Golden Spike Company was an American space transport startup active from 2010 to 2013. The company held the objective to offer private commercial space transportation services to the surface of the Moon. The company's website was quietly taken offline in September 2015.
 The Inspiration Mars Foundation is an American nonprofit organization founded by Dennis Tito that proposed to launch a crewed mission to flyby Mars in January 2018, or 2021 if they missed the first deadline. Their website became defunct by late 2015 but it is archived by the Internet Archive. The Foundation's future plans are unclear.
 Bigelow Aerospace planned to extend their successes with the Genesis modules by launching the B330, an expandable habitation module with 330 cubic meters of internal space, aboard a Vulcan rocket. The Vulcan was contracted to boost BA 330 to low lunar orbit by the end of 2022.

Legality
Under the Outer Space Treaty signed in 1967, the launch operator's nationality and the launch site's location determine which country is responsible for any damages occurred from a launch.

After valuable resources were detected on the Moon, private companies began to formulate methods to extract the resources. Article II of the Outer Space Treaty dictates that "outer space, including the Moon and other celestial bodies, is not subject to national appropriation by claim of sovereignty, by means of use or occupation, or by any other means". However, countries have the right to freely explore the Moon and any resources collected are property of that country when they return.

United States
In December 2005, the US government released a set of proposed rules for space tourism. These included screening procedures and training for emergency situations, but not health requirements.

Under current US law, any company proposing to launch paying passengers from American soil on a suborbital rocket must receive a license from the Federal Aviation Administration's Office of Commercial Space Transportation (FAA/AST). The licensing process focuses on public safety and safety of property, and the details can be found in the Code of Federal Regulations, Title 14, Chapter III. This is in accordance with the Commercial Space Launch Amendments Act passed by Congress in 2004.

In March 2010, the New Mexico legislature passed the Spaceflight Informed Consent Act. The SICA gives legal protection to companies who provide private space flights in the case of accidental harm or death to individuals. Participants sign an Informed Consent waiver, dictating that spaceflight operators cannot be held liable in the "death of a participant resulting from the inherent risks of space flight activities". Operators are however not covered in the case of gross negligence or willful misconduct.

List of space tourism trips
The following list notes each trip taken by an individual for whom a fee was paid (by themselves or another party) to go above the Kármán Line, the internationally recognized boundary of space. It also includes future trips which are paid for and scheduled.

Criticism of the term space tourist
Many private space travelers have objected to the term space tourist, often pointing out that their role went beyond that of an observer, since they also carried out scientific experiments in the course of their journey. Richard Garriott additionally emphasized that his training was identical to the requirements of non-Russian Soyuz crew members, and that teachers and other non-professional astronauts chosen to fly with NASA are called astronauts. He has said that if the distinction has to be made, he would rather be called "private astronaut" than "tourist". Mark Shuttleworth described himself as a "pioneer of commercial space travel". Gregory Olsen prefers "private researcher", and Anousheh Ansari prefers the term "private space explorer". Other space enthusiasts object to the term on similar grounds. Rick Tumlinson of the Space Frontier Foundation, for example, has said: "I hate the word tourist, and I always will ... 'Tourist' is somebody in a flowered shirt with three cameras around his neck." Russian cosmonaut Maksim Surayev told the press in 2009 not to describe Guy Laliberté as a tourist: "It's become fashionable to speak of space tourists. He is not a tourist but a participant in the mission."

"Spaceflight participant" is the official term used by NASA and the Russian Federal Space Agency to distinguish between private space travelers and career astronauts. Tito, Shuttleworth, Olsen, Ansari, and Simonyi were designated as such during their respective space flights. NASA also lists Christa McAuliffe as a spaceflight participant (although she did not pay a fee), apparently due to her non-technical duties aboard the STS-51-L flight.

The US Federal Aviation Administration awards the title of "commercial astronaut" to trained crew members of privately funded spacecraft. The only people currently holding this title are Mike Melvill and Brian Binnie, the pilots of SpaceShipOne in 2004; pilots Mark P. Stucky and Frederick W. Sturckow in 2018, and pilots Dave Mackay, Michael Masucci, and trainer Beth Moses in 2019 aboard SpaceShipTwo on two separate missions.

Attitudes towards space tourism
A 2018 survey from the PEW Research Center identifies the top three motivations for a customer to purchase a flight into space as:
 To experience something unique ( e.g. pioneering, one of a kind)
 To see the view of Earth from space
 To learn more about the world 
The PEW study also found that only 43% of Americans would be definitely or probably interested in going into space.

A web-based survey suggested that over 70% of those surveyed wanted less than or equal to 2 weeks in space; in addition, 88% wanted to spacewalk, of whom 14% would pay a 50% premium for the experience, and 21% wanted a hotel or space station.

The concept has met with some criticism; Günter Verheugen, vice-president of the European Commission, said of the EADS Astrium Space Tourism Project: "It's only for the super-rich, which is against my social convictions".

On 14 October 2021, Prince William suggested that entrepreneurs should focus on saving Earth rather than engaging in space tourism and also warned about a rise in "climate anxiety" among younger generations.

Environmental effects

A 2010 study published in Geophysical Research Letters raised concerns that the growing commercial spaceflight industry could accelerate global warming. The study, funded by NASA and The Aerospace Corporation, simulated the impact of 1,000 suborbital launches of hybrid rockets from a single location, calculating that this would release a total of 600 tonnes of black carbon into the stratosphere. They found that the resultant layer of soot particles remained relatively localized, with only 20% of the carbon straying into the southern hemisphere, thus creating a strong hemispherical asymmetry. The ozone layer would also be affected, with the tropics losing up to 1.7% of ozone cover, and the polar regions gaining 5–6%. The researchers stressed that these results should not be taken as "a precise forecast of the climate response to a specific launch rate of a specific rocket type", but as a demonstration of the sensitivity of the atmosphere to the large-scale disruption that commercial space tourism could bring.

A 2022 study estimated the air pollution impacts on climate change and the ozone layer from rocket launches and re-entry of reusable components and debris in 2019 and from a theoretical future space industry extrapolated from the "billionaire space race". It concludes that substantial effects from routine space tourism should "motivate regulation".

Education and advocacy
Several organizations have been formed to promote the space tourism industry, including the Space Tourism Society, Space Future, and HobbySpace. UniGalactic Space Travel Magazine is a bi-monthly educational publication covering space tourism and space exploration developments in companies like SpaceX, Orbital Sciences, Virgin Galactic and organizations like NASA.

Classes in space tourism are currently taught at the Rochester Institute of Technology in New York, and Keio University in Japan.

Economic potential
A 2010 report from the Federal Aviation Administration, titled "The Economic Impact of Commercial Space Transportation on the U.S. Economy in 2009", cites studies done by Futron, an aerospace and technology-consulting firm, which predict that space tourism could become a billion-dollar market within 20 years. Eight tourists reached orbit between 2001 and 2009. In 2011 Space Adventures suggested that this number could reach 140 by 2020, but with commercial crewed rockets only just beginning to enter service, such numbers have yet to be achieved.

See also

 Commercialization of space
 Effect of spaceflight on the human body
 Private spaceflight
 Space flight participant
 Sub-orbital spaceflight
 Commercial astronaut

References

Further reading

External links

 
 Space Tourists, a documentary film by Christian Frei
 Space Tourism Society, a non-profit research and advocacy group

 
 
American inventions
Russian inventions
Types of tourism
2001 introductions